Siusega is a village in Samoa, on the island of Upolu. The village has a population of 2618.

References

Populated places in Tuamasaga